The Apostolic Datary (Latin: Dataria Apostolica) was one of the five Ufficii di Curia ("Offices of the Curia") in the Roman Curia of the Roman Catholic Church. It was instituted no later than the 14th AD. Pope Paul VI abolished it in 1967.

Origin
According to the De officio et jurisdictione datarii necnon de stylo Datariae of Amydenus and other authorities, the Dataria Apostolica was of very ancient origin, but the previous transaction by other offices of the business that was gradually assigned to it contradicts these authorities. The Dataria was principally entrusted with concession of matrimonial dispensations of external jurisdiction and with collation, i. e., conferral, of benefices and rescripts that were reserved to the Apostolic See. To this double faculty was later added the third of granting many other indults and favors. Until the pontificate of Pope Pius IV, matrimonial dispensations were granted through the Apostolic Penitentiaria. Regarding the authority of collation of reserved benefices, it could not have been granted in ancient times because the institution of those reservations is comparatively recent: although some vestige of the reservations is found prior to the twelfth century, the custom was not frequent before Pope Innocent II, and the reservation of benefices was instituted as a general rule (De pract. et dignit., 3, 4, c. 2 (6°)) only from the pontificate of Pope Clement IV. While the office certainly existed in the fourteenth century, and as an independent one, the date of its institution is unknown.

Constitution
The Dataria consisted of a cardinal as its principal who was titled the "Pro-Datary" ("Prodatarius") until Sapienti Consilio of Pope Pius X, and thereafter was titled "Datarius" ("Datary"). There was formerly as much discussion of the title of "pro-datary" as of that of "vice chancellor" of the Apostolic Chancery: some contend that the title is derived from the fact that the office dated the rescripts of the Supreme Pontiff, while others that it is derived from the right to grant (dare) the indults and rescripts for which petition was made to the Supreme Pontiff. It is certain that, on account of these faculties, the Datary enjoyed great prestige during the flourishing of the office, when he was denominated the "Oculus Papae" ("Eye of the Pope"). After the Cardinal Datary came the "Subdatary" ("Subdatarius"), a prelate of the Roman Curia who assisted the Datary and assumed almost all of the faculties of the Datary as his substitute on occasion. After the Subdatary came a number of subordinate officials who, as De Luca stated, had enigmatical and sibyllic titles, e. g. the "Prefect of the Per Obitum", "Prefect of the Concessum", "Cashier of the Componenda", and "Officer of the Missis".

Reform
Pope Leo XIII reformed the organization of the Dataria to conform it to contemporary requirements. Pope Pius X reduced its faculties and re-organized it in his apostolic constitution Sapienti Consilio, according to which the Dataria consisted of the Cardinal Datary, the Subdatary, the Prefect and his Surrogate (Sostituto), a few officers, the Cashier who was ex officio the Distributor, the Reviser, and 2 scribes of Papal bulls. Sapienti Consilio retained the theological examiners for the competitions for parishes. Among the abrogated offices was that of the Apostolic Dispatchers, for which there was no rationale in the re-organization of the Roman Curia: formerly these officials were necessary because private persons could not refer directly to the Dataria, which dealt only with persons of whom it approved, but later any person could deal directly with it and any other departments of the Roman Curia.

To the Dataria, which was commissioned to grant many Papal indults and favors, remained only the faculties to investigate the fitness of candidates for Consistorial benefices, which were reserved to the Apostolic See; to write and dispatch the Apostolic Letters for the collation of those benefices; to dispense from the conditions of those benefices; and to provide for the pensions or for the execution of the charges imposed by the Pope in the collation of those benefices.

The procedures of the Dataria were complex and primarily regulated by customs, which the officials of the Dataria zealously guarded, being generally laity, and who had by such guarding instituted a species of monopoly of the faculties of the Dataria, as detrimental to the Apostolic See as it was personally profitable to them. Thus it happened that its offices often descended from father to son, while the ecclesiastical superiors of such officials were to a great extent blindly dependent upon them. Pope Leo XIII initiated the reform of this condition of things before Pope Pius X totally rectified it.

Abrogation
After the Second Vatican Council, Pope Paul VI reformed the Roman Curia by the apostolic constitution Regimini Ecclesiae Universae of 15 August 1967, which included the abrogation of the Dataria Apostolica.

References

20th-century disestablishments in Vatican City
Former departments of the Roman Curia